was a Japanese journalist, TV presenter and news anchor.

Career 
Chikushi was born in Hita, Ōita on 23 June 1935. He graduated from Waseda University's school of political science and economics, and joined the Asahi Shimbun newspaper in 1959 as a reporter.

He worked for the Asahi Shimbun'''s political news department, Okinawa bureau, and Washington bureau, before being appointed as managing editor of the Asahi Journal magazine.

He later resigned from the Asahi Shimbun to become the anchorman of TBS's News 23 late-night news programme in October 1989.

He left TBS's News 23'' in May 2007 after announcing on air that he was suffering from cancer.

He died of lung cancer on 7 November 2008 at a hospital in Tokyo, aged 73. He was a guest professor of Waseda University and Ritsumeikan University.

See also 
 Tokyo Broadcasting System Television
 Aum Shinrikyo

References

External links 
 TBS "News 23" 

1935 births
2008 deaths
Deaths from lung cancer in Japan
Japanese broadcast news analysts
Japanese editors
Japanese reporters and correspondents
Japanese television personalities
The Asahi Shimbun people
People from Ōita Prefecture
Academic staff of Ritsumeikan University
Academic staff of Waseda University
Waseda University alumni
20th-century journalists